Medwyn may refer to:


People
 John Hay Forbes, Lord Medwyn (1776–1854), British judge
 Medwyn Goodall (born 1961), English New Age composer and musician
 Medwyn Williams, 20th-21st century prize-winning Welsh gardener

Other uses
 Medwyn, a character in The Chronicles of Prydain, by Lloyd Alexander

See also
 North Medwyn River, Scotland
 South Medwyn River, Scotland
 Medwin, a surname